Richard Carmichael may refer to:

 Richard Bennett Carmichael (1807–1884), American politician
 Richard Carmichael (physician) (1779–1849), Irish surgeon, medical writer and philanthropist
 Richard H. Carmichael, United States Air Force officer